Chester James Benefiel (March 8, 1907 – November 24, 1994) was an American football and basketball coach. He played fullback for the Tulsa football team from 1928 to 1931 before becoming a coach.  He was the head basketball coach for the University of Tulsa from 1932 to 1939, compiling a 65–65 record.  He was also the head coach of the Tulsa Golden Hurricane football team during the 1939 and 1940 seasons, compiling an 11–8–1 record. He resigned in December 1940. In 1942, he was awarded a commission in the United States Navy.

Head coaching record

Football

References

External links
 

1907 births
1994 deaths
American football halfbacks
Basketball coaches from Kansas
Tulsa Golden Hurricane football players
Tulsa Golden Hurricane football coaches
Tulsa Golden Hurricane men's basketball coaches
People from Montgomery County, Kansas